St. John's Metropolitan Community Church is a Christian church catering to the LGBT population in Raleigh, North Carolina, United States. The church is a member congregation of the Metropolitan Community Church (MCC), a worldwide fellowship of LGBT-affirming churches. St. John's is also affiliated with the North Carolina Council of Churches and the Raleigh Religious Network for Lesbian and Gay Equality (RRNLGE). The church located on Maywood Avenue near downtown Raleigh.

St. John's was founded by Willie White and his partner Robert Pace in February 1976. In June of that year, members of St. John's voted to affiliate with the MCC denomination. The following year St. John's members began holding church services at the Community United Church of Christ and continued to use that facility for 17 years. In 1981 White became the faculty advisor for the Gay and Lesbian Christian Alliance (GLCA) at North Carolina State University, now part of the LGBT Services organization.

The second pastor of St. John's was June Norris, the first heterosexual woman to be ordained by the MCC. Norris served the church from 1981 to 1988, participating in NC Pride and testifying before Raleigh City Council in regards to nondiscrimination clauses. The third pastor, Wayne Lindsey, led St. John's purchase of the current church building on South Glenwood Avenue. During this time, the church became active with the RRNLGE and joined the North Carolina chapter of the Council of Churches. Lindsey, who pastored from 1988 to 2001, was an outspoken advocate for LGBT rights in North Carolina.

In July 2001, the church's fourth pastor Brendan Y. Boone became the second African American pastor of St. John's. The church is involved with local LGBT events, such as NC Pride, Gospel Drag, and AIDS awareness. 

Vance Haywood (Pastor Vance) became the church's fifth pastor in January 2018.

See also

 LGBT-welcoming church programs

References

External links
 St. John's Metropolitan Community Church official website

Churches in Raleigh, North Carolina
LGBT churches in the United States
LGBT in North Carolina
Metropolitan Community Churches
Christian organizations established in 1976
1976 establishments in North Carolina